Nandrolone hydrogen succinate (brand name Anabolico, Menidrabol), or nandrolone hemisuccinate, also known as 19-nortestosterone 17β-(3-carboxy)propionate, is a synthetic androgen and anabolic steroid and a nandrolone ester that is or has been marketed in Italy.

See also
 List of androgen esters § Nandrolone esters

References

Androgens and anabolic steroids
Nandrolone esters
Progestogens
Succinate esters